Dipnelix pertricosa is a species of air-breathing land snail, a terrestrial gastropod mollusk in the family Charopidae. This species is endemic to Australia.

References 

Gastropods of Australia
Dipnelix
Gastropods described in 1937
Taxonomy articles created by Polbot